The 2023 Western Michigan Broncos football team will represent Western Michigan University in the 2023 NCAA Division I FBS football season. The Broncos play their home games at Waldo Stadium in Kalamazoo, Michigan, and compete in the West Division of the Mid-American Conference (MAC). They will be led by first-year head coach Lance Taylor who was the offensive coordinator for Louisville in 2022.

Previous season

The Broncos finished the 2022 season 5–7 and 4–4 in the MAC to finish in third place in the West Division.

Schedule

References

Western Michigan
Western Michigan Broncos football seasons
Western Michigan Broncos football